King Dave is a 2016 Canadian drama film directed by "Podz" (Daniel Grou) and starring screenwriter Alexandre Goyette and Karelle Tremblay. Directed as a single shot, it is based on Goyette's stage play of the same name.

The film premiered at the Fantasia International Film Festival. It was nominated for three Canadian Screen Awards.

Plot
Dave is a young man who considers himself to be a king as well as a strong man. When he sees another man dancing with his girlfriend, he sets out for revenge, walking and riding on a car and bus over nine kilometres on his way.

Cast

Production

Alexandre Goyette wrote the film, based on his play. Director Daniel Grou, under his professional pseudonym "Podz", filmed King Dave in five unbroken shots, in five nights. However, all of the footage seen in the released film was taken in the fifth night of shots. Podz said that unlike other "one-shot films" such as Alfred Hitchcock's Rope, this method was not to portray action in real time, but to portray the character narrating in real time. Despite the challenges in the proposed project, producer Nicole Robert was eager to make it and raised a budget of $4.7 million. Art director André Guimond then went location scouting, choosing an area of Montreal for shooting.

Rehearsals took place for weeks before filming commenced. Difficulties on the fourth day caused all of the footage to be unused. Twenty locations were used.

Reception
The film debuted at the Fantasia International Film Festival on 14 July 2016 before a theatrical Quebec release on 15 July. Critical reception was generally positive. The Georgia Straights Ken Eisner, reviewing the film in the Vancouver International Film Festival in October 2016, called it "highly kinetic" and fun. Marc Cassivi gave it three and a half stars in La Presse.

Accolades

References

External links
King Dave at the Internet Movie Database

2016 drama films
2016 films
Canadian drama films
Films based on Canadian plays
Films directed by Daniel Grou
Films set in Montreal
Films shot in Montreal
One-shot films
French-language Canadian films
2010s Canadian films